Lian James Wharton (born 21 February 1977) is a former English cricketer who played for Derbyshire between 2000 and 2003.

Wharton was born in Holbrook, Derbyshire. He appeared for three years as the leading spinner within the Derbyshire line-up, and has since taken his cricketing career into the realms of indoor cricket. He was a left-handed batsman and a left-arm slow bowler. Wharton holds match-best figures of 6-62.

External links
Lian Wharton at CricketArchive 

1977 births
Living people
English cricketers
Derbyshire cricketers
People from Holbrook, Derbyshire
Cricketers from Derbyshire